The Roman Catholic Diocese of Kitale is a diocese located in the city of Kitale in the Ecclesiastical province of Kisumu in Kenya.

History
 April 3, 1998: Established as Diocese of Kitale from the Diocese of Eldoret

Leadership
 Bishops of Kitale (Roman rite)
 Bishop Maurice Anthony Crowley, S.P.S. (April 3, 1998 – November 4, 2022)
Bishop Henry Juma Odonya (since November 4, 2022)

See also
Roman Catholicism in Kenya
Kenya Conference of Catholic Bishops

References

 GCatholic.org
 Catholic Hierarchy

Roman Catholic dioceses in Kenya
Christian organizations established in 1998
Roman Catholic dioceses and prelatures established in the 20th century
1998 establishments in Kenya
Roman Catholic Ecclesiastical Province of Kisumu